This is a list of schools in the London Borough of Enfield, England.

State-funded schools

Primary schools 
Source. Further sourcehttp://www.chat-edu.org.uk/our-academies - Accessed 15 December 2014 (CE indicates Church of England, RC Roman Catholic schools).

Alma Primary School
Ark John Keats Academy
Bowes Primary School
Brettenham Primary School
Brimsdown Primary School
Bush Hill Park Primary School
Capel Manor Primary School
Carterhatch Infant School
Carterhatch Junior School
Chase Side Primary School
Chesterfield Primary School
Churchfield Primary School
De Bohun Primary School
Delta Primary School
Eastfield Primary School
Edmonton County School
Eldon Primary School
Enfield Heights Academy
Eversley Primary School
Firs Farm Primary School
Fleecefield Primary School
Forty Hill Primary School (CE)
Freezywater St George's Primary School (CE)
Galliard Primary School
Garfield Primary School
George Spicer Primary School
Grange Park Primary School
Hadley Wood Primary School
Hazelbury Primary School
Hazelwood Infant School
Hazelwood Junior School
Highfield Primary School
Honilands Primary School
Houndsfield Primary School
Keys Meadow Primary School
Kingfisher Hall Primary Academy
Latymer All Saints Primary School (CE)
Lavender Primary School
Meridian Angel Primary School
Merryhills Primary School
Oakthorpe Primary School
Oasis Academy Hadley
One Degree Academy
Our Lady of Lourdes Primary School (RC)
Prince of Wales Primary School
Raglan Infant School
The Raglan Junior School
Raynham Primary School
St Andrew's Primary School (CE)
St Andrew's Southgate Primary School (CE)
St Edmund's Primary School (RC)
St George's Primary School (RC)
St James Primary School (CE)
St John & St James Primary School (CE)
St John's Primary School (CE)
St Mary's Primary School (RC)
St Matthew's Primary School (CE)
St Michael at Bowes Junior School (CE)
St Michael's Primary School (CE)
St Monica's Primary School (RC)
St Paul's Primary School (CE)
Southbury Primary School
Starks Field Primary School
Suffolks Primary School
Tottenhall Infant School
Walker Primary School
West Grove Primary School
Wilbury Primary School
Wolfson Hillel Primary School
Woodpecker Hall Primary Academy
Worcesters Primary School

Non-selective secondary schools

AIM North London Academy
Ark John Keats Academy
Aylward Academy
Bishop Stopford's School
Broomfield School
Chace Community School
Edmonton County School
Enfield County School
Enfield Grammar School
Heron Hall Academy
Highlands School
Kingsmead School
Lea Valley Academy
Oasis Academy Enfield
Oasis Academy Hadley
One Degree Academy
St Anne's Catholic High School
St Ignatius' College
Southgate School
Winchmore School
Wren Academy Enfield

Grammar schools
The Latymer School (selective, co-ed)

Special and alternative schools

Durants School
Fern House School
Oaktree School
Orchardside School
Russet House School
Salmons Brook School
Waverley School
West Lea School

Further education
Barnet and Southgate College
Capel Manor College
The College of Haringey, Enfield and North East London

Independent schools

Primary and preparatory schools
Grange Park Preparatory School
Keble School
Salcombe Preparatory School

Senior and all-through schools
Palmers Green High School
Phoenix Academy
St John's Senior School
Vita Et Pax School

Special and alternative schools
Alternative Centre of Education
First Rung Independent School
Focus 1st Academy
Freshsteps Independent school
North London Hospital School
Silverways School

References

 
Enfield